Shanti Gandhi (born 10 February 1940) is an India-born American cardiovascular and thoracic surgeon and was a Republican member of the Kansas House of Representatives, representing the 52nd District from 2013 to 2015. He won a contested party primary and won again in the 2012 general election.

He arrived in the U.S. in 1967 as a medical graduate from University of Bombay.  Shanti is the son of Kantilal Gandhi and Saraswati Gandhi, grandson of Hiralal Gandhi and Gulab Gandhi, and the great-grandson of the Indian Independence movement leader Mahatma Gandhi. He retired as a cardiovascular and thoracic surgeon from Stormont–Vail Hospital at Topeka, Kansas in 2010.

At his request, the news media did not mention his ancestry to Mahatma Gandhi during the 2012 campaign. Gandhi later said he was surprised the media honored his request. Gandhi said he simply wanted to be known as a heart surgeon, father and friend to many; he did not want to win election from the name recognition of being a descendant of the famous Indian leader.

Gandhi came to the U.S. soon after graduation from the University of Bombay, to serve as an intern at a Youngstown, Ohio hospital, at a time when heart surgery was in its infancy. His father had encouraged him to take the internship. Lacking money for travel, the hospital loaned him the money for airfare. He met his wife, Susan, at hospital, where she was a registered nurse. He became a naturalized U.S. citizen in 1975, and started St. Francis Hospital's heart surgery program after being invited by the Topeka hospital in 1978.

Committee membership
 Education
 Federal and State Affairs
 Social Services Budget

Elections

2012

Gandhi defeated William Scott Hesse and Dick Jones in a three-way Republican primary on 7 August 2012, and defeated Democratic nominee Theodore "Ted" Ensley in the general election on 6 November 2012, by a margin of 6,472 to 5,425.

References

External links
Votesmart.org-Shanti Gandhi
Campaign website
Kansas General Assembly profile
India Journal election report

Shanti
1940 births
Living people
American politicians of Indian descent
Indian emigrants to the United States
University of Mumbai alumni
American thoracic surgeons
Indian thoracic surgeons
Politicians from Topeka, Kansas
Republican Party members of the Kansas House of Representatives
Medical doctors from Mumbai
Naturalized citizens of the United States
Asian-American people in Kansas politics
21st-century American politicians
Asian conservatism in the United States